Michael Kleeberg (born 24 August 1959 in Stuttgart), is a German writer and translator. He studied political science and modern history at the University of Hamburg and visual communication at the Kunsthochschule Hamburg. He lived in Rome, Berlin, Amsterdam and Paris in the 1980s and 1990s. Since 2000 he lives in Berlin as a full-time writer and translator from English and French.

Bibliography
 Böblinger Brezeln. Munich 1984.
 Der saubere Tod. Munich 1987.
 Proteus der Pilger. Halle 1993.
 Barfuß. Short stories, Kiepenheuer & Witsch, Cologne 1995.
 Terror in Normalien. Comedy, Hunzinger Bühnenverlag, Bad Homburg vor der Höhe 1995.
 Der Kommunist vom Montmartre und andere Geschichten. Kiepenheuer und Witsch, Cologne 1997.
 Ein Garten im Norden. Ullstein, Berlin 1998.
 The King of Corsica (Der König von Korsika). Novel. DVA, Stuttgart/ Munich 2001. In English 2007.
 Das Tier, das weint. Libanesisches Reisetagebuch. DVA, Munich 2004.
 Karlmann. btb, Munich 2007.
 Aufgehoben. Kleines Mainzer Brevier. Schmidt, Mainz 2008.
 Das Amerikanische Hospital. Novel. Deutsche Verlags-Anstalt.
 Luca Puck und der Herr der Ratten. Dressler.
 Michael Kleeberg im Gespräch. Wehrhahn, Hannover 2013.
 Vaterjahre. Novel. Deutsche Verlags-Anstalt, Munich 2014.

Accolades
 1996: Anna Seghers-Preis
 2000: Lion-Feuchtwanger-Preis
 2008: Mainzer Stadtschreiber
 2008: Irmgard-Heilmann-Preis
 2011: New-York-Stipendium des Deutschen Literaturfonds
 2011: Evangelischer Buchpreis for Das Amerikanische Hospital
 2013: Saarländischer Kinder- und Jugendbuchpreis 2012
 2015: Friedrich-Hölderlin-Preis der Stadt Bad Homburg

References

External links

 Official website 

1959 births
Living people
Writers from Stuttgart
20th-century German novelists
21st-century German novelists
English–German translators
French–German translators
German male short story writers
German short story writers
German translators
German-language writers
German male novelists
20th-century German short story writers
21st-century German short story writers
20th-century German male writers
21st-century German male writers
German male non-fiction writers
University of Hamburg alumni